Transforming growth factor-beta 2 (TGF-β2) is a secreted protein known as a cytokine that performs many cellular functions and has a vital role during embryonic development (alternative names: Glioblastoma-derived T-cell suppressor factor, G-TSF, BSC-1 cell growth inhibitor, Polyergin, Cetermin). It is an extracellular glycosylated protein. It is known to suppress the effects of interleukin dependent T-cell tumors. There are two named isoforms of this protein, created by alternative splicing of the same gene (i.e.).

Further reading

Proteins
TGFβ domain